Gamaliel Painter (May 22, 1742 – May 21, 1819) was an American politician and a key figure in the founding of Middlebury, Vermont, and Middlebury College.

Life and legacy
Painter was born to Shubael and Elizabeth (Dunbar) Painter in New Haven, Connecticut Colony.

Painter's first wife, Abigail (Chipman) Painter, was the sister of John Chipman, the first settler of Middlebury in 1767. At her prompting, the Painters themselves settled in Middlebury in 1773. He purchased fifty acres along Otter Creek, eventually building a number of mills and selling smaller plots of land or donating them for public buildings, including the courthouse and Congregational church. He served in a number of political offices: member of the Vermont Constitutional Convention (1777), judge of the Addison County Court (1785, 1787–1794), sheriff of Addison County (1786), and member of the Vermont House of Representatives (1788–1792).

Painter is most known for his association with Middlebury College. Painter was one of the people who obtained a charter for the college from the Vermont General Assembly. He presided over the construction of the college's first building, Painter Hall, built from 1812 to 1816. Upon his death, he left most of his estate, $13000, to the college.

Painter's bequest included his walking cane. The cane is employed as the institutional mace for official events, such as freshman convocation, where it is passed around to new students, and Middlebury College students are given a replica of the cane upon graduation. The cane has its own song, "Gamaliel Painter's Cane," penned in 1917:When Gamaliel Painter died, he was Middlebury's pride, A sturdy pioneer without a stain;And he left his all by will, to the college on the hill,And included his codicil cane.Oh, its rap rap rap, and it's tap tap tap, If you listen you can hear it sounding plain; For a helper true and tried, as the generations glide, There is nothing like Gamaliel Painter's cane.

References

External links 

 "Gamaliel Painter's Cane" sung by The Dissipated Eight
 

1742 births
1819 deaths
Middlebury College
People from Middlebury, Vermont
Politicians from New Haven, Connecticut
Members of the Vermont House of Representatives
Vermont state court judges
Vermont sheriffs
18th-century American judges
18th-century American politicians